Cheney High School is a public high school in Cheney, Kansas, United States. It is operated by Cheney USD 268 school district. The school is located at 800 North Marshall Street.

Greg Rosenhagen is the Principal. Todd Hague is the Vice Principal. The school mascot is the cardinals and the school colors are red and blue.  There are approximately 236 students and 22 teachers at Cheney High School. The graduation rate is 94 percent and minority enrollment around 11 percent. US News ranked Cheney High School bronze.

History
Plans for building a high school in Cheney were announced in 1907.

See also
 List of high schools in Kansas
 List of unified school districts in Kansas

References

External links
 Cheney High School website
 Cheney High School Athletics website

Schools in Sedgwick County, Kansas
Public high schools in Kansas
1907 establishments in Kansas